Maximillian Zorin is a fictional character and the main antagonist in the 1985 James Bond film A View to a Kill. He is portrayed by Christopher Walken.

Biography
Zorin was born in Dresden around the end of World War II, after which Dresden became part of East Germany. He later moved to France and became a leading businessman through energy trading, eventually transitioning into the electronics industry and operating on the microchip market. According to a briefing by M and Frederick Gray, Zorin is outwardly a staunch anti-communist with high influence in the French government. However, it is revealed later in the movie that he was the product of Nazi medical experimentation during the war, in which pregnant women were injected with massive quantities of steroids in an attempt to create "super-children." Most of the pregnancies failed. The few surviving babies grew to become extraordinarily intelligent—but also psychopathic.
 
After the war, Dr. Hans Glaub (alias Dr. Carl Mortner), the German scientist who conducted the experiments, was spirited away by the Soviet Union, where he continued his experiments with steroids. It is strongly implied that the young Zorin was raised by Mortner as his own father, who was one of Zorin's closest allies in the movie, and explicitly stated that Zorin was trained by and long-affiliated with the KGB. Among other activities, Mortner organizes a doping programme for Zorin's thoroughbred race horses, allowing Zorin to win horse races with ease by activating illegal horse steroids by means of implanted microchips; since the drugs are 'administered' during the race, they do not show up on blood tests taken beforehand, and the dose is so minute that they dissolve into the system before tests can be taken afterwards.

Despite Zorin's longtime KGB affiliation, his outside activities draw attention that the KGB sees as unwelcome, and at a meeting between Zorin and KGB head General Gogol, Gogol rebukes him. Zorin responds by telling Gogol that he no longer considers himself a KGB employee.

Zorin is completely ruthless and displays a near-total lack of loyalty to his own men, as shown when he oversaw the execution of a Soviet spy who attempted to sabotage his oil well operations and when he personally massacres dozens of his own mine workers with a 9mm UZI submachine gun to ensure the success of his own plans. Despite his long-standing and intimate relationship with his right-hand woman May Day, he willingly sacrifices her for the sake of his plans, although this betrayal would backfire on him later on.

Zorin forms a plan to destroy his only competition in Silicon Valley by triggering a massive earthquake in the San Andreas Fault at high tide, causing the valley to flood. Such a disaster would effectively wipe out all computer companies competing against Zorin in the world microchip market and leave him as the leading supplier of microchips; it would also kill millions of people. He plans to use his vast resources to set off a super-earthquake in both the San Andreas Fault and Hayward Fault by flooding them both with water from San Andreas Lake and then breaking the geological lock that forbade both faults from moving simultaneously. To accomplish this, Zorin mines underneath the lakes and plans to blast through the lake beds in order to flood the fault, further exacerbating it by pumping water into them via a vast system of oil wells. Once the floodwaters came in, he would set off the explosives necessary to break the lock.

Zorin's plan is foiled by Bond and Zorin's former lover and henchwoman May Day, who joins Bond's side after Zorin attempts to kill her. She pushes a trailer carrying the explosive detonator out of the valley and into open air, sacrificing her own life in the process.

Bond and Stacey Sutton both witness the explosion, which infuriates Zorin and makes him even more determined to get revenge on Bond. When leaving the valley in his airship with Scarpine and Mortner, he captures Stacey and makes away with her, only for Bond to grab hold of a mooring rope as the airship heads for the Golden Gate Bridge. Zorin attempts to kill Bond by flying him into the framework of the bridge, but Bond manages to hold on and bring the airship to a halt by mooring it to the framework. Stacey attacks Zorin and in the scuffle both Scarpine and Mortner are knocked out. She escapes onto the bridge with Bond, and Zorin attempts to attack them both with an axe, but in the scuffle he loses his grip of the framework and falls to his death into San Francisco Bay.  Witnessing Zorin's death, Mortner fires his gun at Bond and Stacey, missing them, he retreats into the airship and retrieves some dynamite, lights it and attempts to throw it at Bond, however, Bond takes the axe and severs the mooring cable attaching the airship to the bridge. Now that the airship is free, it flies away from the bridge, while Mortner and Scarpine try to throw out the dynamite, however time runs out and the dynamite detonates, destroying the airship and killing both Scarpine and Mortner.

Behind the scenes
The role was initially offered to David Bowie, who turned it down, saying, "I didn't want to spend five months watching my stunt double fall off cliffs." Rutger Hauer also turned down the part, before Christopher Walken signed on.

Legal problems arose before the film's release when producers became aware there was a pre-existing similarly named Zoran Corporation which made microchips. The Zoran Corporation threatened to sue for defamation. Pre-production crew had neglected to do a trademark search prior to filming. The parties came to an agreement and, because of this, A View to a Kill is the first 007 film with a legal disclaimer inserted at the beginning.

Henchmen
 May Day (formerly) – changed sides and sacrificed herself to remove the master bomb from Zorin's mine
 Scarpine – blown up in zeppelin explosion
 Jenny Flex (formerly) – killed in the mine flood
 Pan Ho (formerly) – killed in the mine flood
 Dr. Hans Glaub/Carl Mortner – blown up in zeppelin explosion

Other appearances
Zorin is a playable multiplayer character in the 2002 video game, James Bond 007: Nightfire.

In the 2004 video game, James Bond 007: Everything or Nothing, it is revealed that Zorin had an apprentice named Nikolai Diavolo (voiced by Willem Dafoe), who plans to use nanobots to commence the rebirth of the Soviet Union. Diavolo also wishes to kill Bond in order to exact vengeance for Zorin's death.

References

Bond villains
Fictional business executives
Fictional characters from Saxony
Fictional Russian people
Fictional genetically engineered characters
Fictional KGB agents
A View to a Kill
Film characters introduced in 1985
Fictional mass murderers
Male characters in film
Male film villains
Action film villains
Fictional gangsters
Fictional crime bosses
Film supervillains